Dernekpazarı is a district of Trabzon Province in the Black Sea region of Turkey.The old name of the town was Kondu (or Kondualtı) and the current mayor of the town is Mehmet Aşık (AKP). Dernekpazarı is part of the Of-valley system ('Solaklı Vadisi' in Turkish); it lies between the coastal Of district and the alpine Çaykara district.

History

The history of Dernekpazarı is closely related to the history of the Trabzon, the largest city of the Black Sea Region. Depending who ruled the Trabzon Province, the hill country came under Roman, Byzantine and Ottoman sovereignty. The population consisted largely of Pontic Greeks who converted to Islam during the 17th and 18th centuries. Currently the Of dialect of Pontic Greek (locally called 'Romeyka') is still spoken in the villages and nearly all locally current place names are in Greek. A few residents of the district who retained their Christian faith at the beginning of the 20th century were resettled in the town of Nea Trapezounta, near Katerini in Greece, in the wake of the population exchange between Greece and Turkey in 1923.

Villages
The villages are listed north to south, with their Turkish and Greek names:

Gülen - Visir / Βυζίρ'
Dernekpazarı - Kondu / Κοντού
Akköse - Zeno / Ζένο
Zincirlitaş - Vezeno / Βετζονά

The following villages are part of the 'Holo' community in the southwest of the district:
Yenice - Marladas / Μαρλαδάς
Günebakan - Zenozena / Ζενόζενα
Tüfekçi - Arşela / Αρσέλα
Çalışanlar - Kalanas / Καλανός
 - Makidanos / Μακιδάνος
Taşçılar - Fotkene / Φώτγκενε
Çayırbaşı - Havaşo / Χαβάσο

References

External links
 District governor's official website 

Populated places in Trabzon Province
Districts of Trabzon Province
Dernekpazarı District